William Eley was an English professional footballer who played as an outside right.

Career
Eley played for Matlock Town and Bradford City.

For Bradford City he made 1 appearance in the Football League.

Sources

References

Year of birth missing
Year of death missing
English footballers
Matlock Town F.C. players
Bradford City A.F.C. players
English Football League players
Association football outside forwards